Drømmeslottet is a 1986 Norwegian drama film written and directed by Petter Vennerød and Svend Wam, starring a large ensemble cast including Lasse Lindtner and Mari Maurstad. The film is part of a trilogy by the directors, where the other two instalments were titled Åpen framtid (1983) and Adjø solidaritet (1985). Three couples who have known each other since early youth decide to move in together, but soon run into difficulties.

External links
 
 

1986 films
1986 drama films
Films directed by Svend Wam
Films directed by Petter Vennerød
Norwegian drama films
Films set in Oslo